Camille Wolff (15 June 1894 – 30 December 1977) was a Luxembourgian tennis player. He competed in the men's singles event at the 1924 Summer Olympics.

References

External links
 

1894 births
1977 deaths
Luxembourgian male tennis players
Olympic tennis players of Luxembourg
Tennis players at the 1924 Summer Olympics
Sportspeople from Luxembourg City